Zachary Thomas Jackson (born May 13, 1983) is an American former professional baseball pitcher. He played in Major League Baseball (MLB) for the Milwaukee Brewers and Cleveland Indians.

Amateur career
Jackson attended Texas A&M University, and in 2003 he played collegiate summer baseball with the Hyannis Mets of the Cape Cod Baseball League where he was named a league all-star. After his junior year, Jackson was selected by the Toronto Blue Jays in the first round, 32nd overall, in the 2004 Major League Baseball Draft.

Professional career

Toronto Blue Jays

Jackson signed with Toronto, and jumped to Triple-A in his first season in the Blue Jays organization. At the end of the year, the Blue Jays traded him along with Dave Bush and Gabe Gross to the Brewers for Lyle Overbay and Ty Taubenheim in December 2005.

Milwaukee Brewers
The Brewers started Jackson playing in Triple-A for the Nashville Sounds at the beginning of 2006. Jackson pitched well and had a 3.00 ERA for the first month and a half. The Brewers called Jackson up on June 2 to help with their current pitching problems. Jackson filled a major void left by the injured Tomo Ohka, replacing him in the starting lineup. He fared much better than expected and was sent back down to Triple-A to fine-tune his game, where he spent the entire 2007 season.

Cleveland Indians
On July 7, 2008, Jackson was part of the deal that sent Cy Young award winner CC Sabathia to Milwaukee for left fielder Matt LaPorta, pitcher Rob Bryson, and Michael Brantley. Jackson was recalled in August 2008 to fill the starting pitcher spot vacated by recently traded Paul Byrd.

Toronto Blue Jays
On January 9, 2010, Jackson was traded back to his first team, the Toronto Blue Jays, for a player to be named later.

Texas Rangers
Jackson was signed as free agent by the Texas Rangers on January 6, 2011.

Kansas City Royals
Jackson signed a minor league contract with the Kansas City Royals on February 11, 2013.

Washington Nationals
Jackson signed a minor league contract with the Washington Nationals on January 17, 2014. He was released on July 27.

On July 20, 2015, Jackson announced his retirement from baseball.

References

External links

Minor League Splits and situational stats
Zach Jackson Interview at BrewCrewBall.com

1983 births
Living people
Milwaukee Brewers players
Cleveland Indians players
Louisville Cardinals baseball players
Texas A&M Aggies baseball players
Dunedin Blue Jays players
Auburn Doubledays players
New Hampshire Fisher Cats players
Syracuse SkyChiefs players
Nashville Sounds players
Buffalo Bisons (minor league) players
Columbus Clippers players
Las Vegas 51s players
Northwest Arkansas Naturals players
Round Rock Express players
Omaha Storm Chasers players
Baseball players from Pennsylvania
Major League Baseball pitchers
People from Greensburg, Pennsylvania
Syracuse Chiefs players
Yaquis de Obregón players
American expatriate baseball players in Mexico
Leones del Escogido players
American expatriate baseball players in the Dominican Republic
Harrisburg Senators players
Lancaster Barnstormers players
Hyannis Harbor Hawks players